Jung Chul-Woon (born July 30, 1986) is a South Korean football player who currently plays as a centre back, for Thai Premier League side Pattaya United. His previous clubs are K-League club Gangwon FC and Korea National League side Daejeon Korea Hydro & Nuclear Power FC.

On November 18, 2008, he was one of sixteen priority members to join Gangwon FC. He made his debut for Gangwon against Daegu FC on April 8, 2009 in league cup match. His first league match for Gangwon against FC Seoul on July 19, 2009 by substitute for teammate Lee Se-In.

Club career statistics

References

External links
 

1986 births
Living people
South Korean footballers
South Korean expatriate footballers
Gangwon FC players
Jung Chul-woon
K League 1 players
Korea National League players
Expatriate footballers in Thailand
South Korean expatriate sportspeople in Thailand
Association football defenders